Michael James Sislo (born January 20, 1988) is an American former professional ice hockey right wing. He played in the National Hockey League (NHL) with the New Jersey Devils.

Playing career
On April 5, 2011, the New Jersey Devils signed Sislo as an undrafted free agent to a two-year entry-level contract.
 
During the 2013–14 season, Sislo made his NHL debut with the New Jersey Devils, playing 8 minutes and 29 seconds and recording two shots on net, in a 5-3 loss to the visiting Chicago Blackhawks on January 3, 2014.

After five seasons within the  Devils organization, Sislo left as a free agent on July 1, 2016, signing a one-year, two-way contract to join the Colorado Avalanche. Added with the expectation to carry the offensive load for AHL affiliate, the San Antonio Rampage, Sislo managed just 6 goals in 54 games in the 2016–17 season before he was loaned by the Avalanche in an AHL trade to the Toronto Marlies for Colin Smith on March 1, 2017. Sislo made an instant impact with the Marlies, regaining his scoring touch to finish the season with 8 goals and 16 points in 18 games.

On July 1, 2017, having left the Avalanche as a free agent, Sislo agreed to a one-year, two-way contract with the Arizona Coyotes. In the 2017–18 season, Sislo provided a veteran presence to the Coyotes AHL affiliate, the Tucson Roadrunners. He rebounded statistically from the previous season to record 23 goals and 47 points in 68 regular season games before helping Tucson advance to the second round in the post-season.

At the conclusion of the season on June 14, 2018, Sislo was traded by the Coyotes to the Buffalo Sabres along with Brandon Hickey in exchange for Hudson Fasching. Sislo's rights were left to expire by the Sabres, and as a free agent he agreed to a one-year, two-way contract with the New York Islanders on July 2, 2018.

After spending his first nine professional seasons contracted within in the NHL, Sislo left as a free agent following the 2018–19 campaign in signing a European deal with German outfit, Grizzlys Wolfsburg of the Deutsche Eishockey Liga (DEL) on July 10, 2019. Sislo recorded just 3 assists through 9 games before ending his career through persistent back injuries on January 11, 2019.

Career statistics

References

External links

1988 births
Living people
Albany Devils players
American men's ice hockey right wingers
Bridgeport Sound Tigers players
Grizzlys Wolfsburg players
Ice hockey players from Wisconsin
New Jersey Devils players
New Hampshire Wildcats men's ice hockey players
Sportspeople from Superior, Wisconsin
San Antonio Rampage players
Toronto Marlies players
Tucson Roadrunners players
Undrafted National Hockey League players